T.V. Rao (born 14 March 1946) is an Indian Human Resources Development professional.

A new Human Resource Development system emerged in India in 1974 with Dr. T.V. Rao and Dr. Udai Pareek heading the movement. It was started as a "Review Exercise of the Performance Appraisal System" for Larsen & Toubro by the duo from the Indian Institute of Management, Ahmedabad (IIMA) which resulted in the development of a new function - The Human Resources Development Function. Rao and Dr Udai Pareek were instrumental in setting up the HRD Department for L&T and making it the first company in this part of the world to have fully Dedicated HRD Department.

As HRD started growing Larsen & Toubro instituted a HRD Chair Professorship at XLRI, Jamshedpur. Between 1983 and 1985, Dr. T.V. Rao moved to XLRI as L&T Professor to set up the Centre for HRD. While returning to IIMA from XLRI after setting up the CHRD, Dr. Rao conceptualized along with Fr. E. Abraham a Professional body which was later registered as the National HRD Network. Dr. Rao became the Founder President of the National HRD Network and was also President of the Indian Society for Applied Behavioural Sciences (ISABS) 1986-89. Rao had worked as a professor at the premier management institute of India - the IIM, Ahmedabad from 1973 - 1994. After leaving the IIMA, he started working for the Academy of Human Resources Development which was set up with support from RMCEI of IIMA. He worked as its Honorary Director for some time.

During the last three decades, Rao has been popularizing the methodology of "Developing Leadership through Feedback by Known People" (DLFKP), which he developed in the mid 1980s at IIMA and worked on it along with Prof. P. N. Khandwalla, J.P. Singh and S. Ramnarayan. This methodology is later termed by other specialists as 360 degree feedback methodology. To popularize this methodology as a development tool, he has started a 360 degree feedback club and has also conducted over hundreds of workshops in the last 30 years in India, Thailand, Philippines, Nigeria, Sri Lanka and Egypt. Currently, he is developing HRD Auditors and Trainers of Development Centers and creating manuals for HRD Audit in an effort to make HRD Audit like ISO certification. The HR Score Card as known today was created by him much before it was published from the US.
Rao also worked as a visiting faculty at ISB Hyderabad and IIM Ranchi earlier.

Professional career

Rao is currently Chairman, of TVRLS, Ahmedabad. He was Professor at the Indian Institute of Management, Ahmedabad for over 20 years beginning 1973. While at IIMA he was Chairman of the Post Graduate Program, Fellow Program, Public Systems Group, Ravi Matthai Center and also coordinated the PGP review. He left in 1994 to serve as Honorary Director of the Academy of Human Resources Development. He set up TVRLS in 1996, two years after he left IIMA.

He was a Visiting Professor since then and Adjunct Professor at IIMA since 2006 and until 2014. He was on the Board of  IIMA from 2014 to 2018. Rao has also contributed majorly in the field of competency mapping and defines competency mapping as the process of identification of the competencies required to perform successfully at a given point of time. He worked with David McClelland of Harvard University (the initiator of the competency movement) and had joint research projects with him in seventies. Rao was a Visiting Faculty at the Indian Business School, Hyderabad and as HRD Advisor to the Reserve Bank of India. Dr Rao assisted the Administrative Reforms Commission in reviewing the personnel management practices for civil services, and also served as member of the HRM Review Committee of Nationalised Banks set up by the Ministry of Finance in 2009–2010.

Rao's consulting work is in the areas of designing and managing HRD systems of various corporations in India and other Asian countries. He assisted a number of Organizations on various HR themes. Dr.Rao's consulting experience includes agencies like the USAID, UNESCO, UNIDO, UNICEF, FAO, Commonwealth Secretariat, London; World Bank, Action Aid, Swiss Agency for Development Cooperation, ICOMP etc. and various corporations like Alexandria Carbon Black, Gulfar, CHR Oman, Commercial Bank, Kewalram Chanrai Group, Indorama Synthetics, Thai Carbon Black, etc. and covers countries including the US, Mexico, UK, Netherlands, Egypt, Nigeria, Sri Lanka, Bangladesh, Singapore, Malaysia, Indonesia, Thailand, Philippines, Gulf countries, South Africa etc. Rao has authored or coauthored or edited over 60 books dealing with HRD, Education Management, Health and Population Management, Entrepreneurship Development among others.

Publications

Rao's Leadership Development methodology started in mid-eighties using what is later termed in the USA as 360 Degree Feedback. And HRD audit methodology leading to HRD Score card 2500 are first of its kind in this part of the world Rao has authored or coauthored or edited over fifty books dealing with Organizational Behavior, HRD, Education Management, Health and Population Management, Entrepreneurship Development etc.

Awards

References

Living people
Academic staff of the Indian Institute of Management Ahmedabad
1946 births